Erxleben is a municipality in the Börde district in Saxony-Anhalt, Germany. On 31 December 2009 it absorbed the former municipality Bregenstedt, followed by the former municipalities Bartensleben, Hakenstedt and Uhrsleben on 1 January 2010. The municipality consists of the Ortsteile (municipal divisions) Bregenstedt, Erxleben, Groß Bartensleben, Groppendorf, Hakenstedt, Klein Bartensleben and Uhrsleben.

 was owned by the House of Alvensleben from around 1270 until expropriation in 1945 by communist East Germany.

References 

Municipalities in Saxony-Anhalt
Börde (district)